Angelino may refer to:

People
 Angelino Alfano (born 1970), Italian politician
 Angelino Apelar (1927–2006), Evangelical Christian leader
 Angelino Dulcert, Italian-Majorcan cartographer
 Angelino Fons (1936–2011), Spanish film director and screenwriter
 Angelino Garzón, former Vice President of Colombia
 Angelino Medoro (1567–1631), Italian painter during the 17th-century, active in Latin America
 Angelino Rosa, Italian professional football player
 Angelino Soler (born 1939), Spanish road bicycle racer
 José Angelino Caamal, Mexican politician
 Angeliño, officially José Ángel Tasende, Spanish footballer

Other
 Angelino Heights, Los Angeles, California
 El Clásico Angelino football rivalry